McCalmon is a surname. Notable people with the surname include:

Eddie McCalmon (1902–1987), Canadian ice hockey player
Jason McCalmon (born 1987), English boxer